The Volleyball Thailand League is the highest level of Thailand club volleyball in the 2013–14 season and the 9th edition.

Team
 Cosmo Chiangrai
 Chonburi
 Krungkao
 Nakhon Ratchasima
 Kasetsart 
 Pibulsongkram Phitsanulok
 Suandusit
 Maejo U. Thai-Denmark

Regular season

Ranking

|}

Round 1

|}

Round 2

|}

Final standing

Awards

References

External links
 Official Website
 Official Facebook

Volleyball,Men's Thailand League
Volleyball,Men's Thailand League
2013